The Chinese grey shrike (Lanius sphenocercus) is a species of bird in the family Laniidae.
It is found in China, Japan, North Korea, South Korea, Mongolia, and the Russian Far East.
Its natural habitat is temperate forests. The giant grey shrike (L. giganteus) of central China was formerly considered a subspecies.

References

External links
Images at ADW

Chinese grey shrike
Birds of China
Birds of Korea
Birds of Manchuria
Chinese grey shrike
Taxonomy articles created by Polbot